The 1944 United States Senate special election in New Jersey was held on November 7, 1944. 

The election was held to fill the unexpired term of William Warren Barbour, who died in November 1943. H. Alexander Smith, who had been elected in a 1944 special election following the death of William Warren Barbour, was elected to the open seat over Democratic U.S. Representative Elmer H. Wene.

The incumbent Democratic appointee, Arthur Walsh, did not run.

Democratic primary

Candidates
Elmer H. Wene, U.S. Representative from Vineland

Declined
Arthur Walsh, interim Senator

Results

Republican primary

Candidates
H. Alexander Smith, Princeton attorney and member of the Republican National Committee
Andrew O. Wittreich, Tenafly resident

Results

General election

Candidates
John C. Butterworth (Socialist Labor)
George W. Ridout (Prohibition), Methodist minister
Morris Riger (Socialist)
H. Alexander Smith (Republican), Princeton attorney and member of the Republican National Committee
Elmer H. Wene (Democratic), U.S. Representative from Vineland

Results

See also 
1944 United States Senate elections

References

New Jersey 1944
New Jersey 1944
1944 Special
New Jersey Special
United States Senate Special
United States Senate 1944